Following the 1949 establishment of the German Democratic Republic (GDR) the new state prohibited the wearing of all pre-1945 German decorations and created a new system of awards inspired in part by those of the USSR.

After German reunification in 1990, the wearing of East German decorations was not forbidden with the exception of those considered to be in breach of public order such as decorations of the Ministry for State Security, Border troops, Combat Groups, and Free German Youth (FDJ).

Honorary titles

State prizes

State orders

State medals

Military and para-military decorations

Civilian decorations

Ministerial and associative awards

Ministry of National Defence

Ministry of Education

Combat Groups of the Working Class of the GDR

Society for Sports and Technology

Free German Youth Society 

These were awarded to Free German Youth (F.D.J.) members;

Socialist Unity Party 

These were conferred by the Socialist Unity Party (S.E.D.);

See also 

Germany
 Berlin
 Berlin Wall
 East Berlin
 West Berlin
 History of East Germany
 History of Germany since 1945
 Inner German border
 Iron Curtain
 Leaders of East Germany
 Ministerrat
 West Germany

Armed Forces
 Conscientious objection in East Germany
  (Border troops)
  (Ground troops)
  (Air Force)
 National People's Army
  (Secret police)
  (Navy)
  (Police)

Media
 , GDR's main TV news show
 , a film about a mass evacuation to West Berlin through a tunnel
 
 East German Cold War Propaganda
 Good Bye, Lenin!, a tragicomedy film about the German reunification
 Radio Berlin International
 

Transport
 Barkas
 The railway company of the GDR
 The airline of the GDR
 Trabant
 Transport in the German Democratic Republic
 Wartburg

Other
 Education in the German Democratic Republic
 Index of East Germany-related articles
 GDR jokes
  (Nostalgia, missing the DDR)
 
 Dean Reed
 Sportvereinigung (SV) Dynamo
 Tourism in East Germany
 Omoiyari Yosan (DDR government→USSR Forces)
 Captive Nations
 Socialist orders of merit

References

Society of East Germany
 
1990 disestablishments in Germany